Power plant or Powerplant may refer to:

Power generation 
A power station, a facility for the generation of electrical power
An engine and related systems that propel a vehicle
An aircraft engine and its propeller (usually used in countries other than the U.S.)

Music
Power Plant (Gamma Ray album), released in 1999
Power Plant (Golden Dawn album), released in 1968
Powerplant (album), by Girlpool, released in 2017

Other 
PowerPlant, an object-oriented application framework for the Mac OS by Metrowerks
The Power Plant, a contemporary art gallery located in Toronto
Power Plant Live!, a club near Baltimore's Inner Harbor
Power Plant Mall, a shopping mall in Makati, Philippines
WCW Power Plant, professional wrestling school

See also 
 Power station (disambiguation)